Reino Tuominen (30 March 1935 – 27 December 1974) was a Finnish wrestler. He competed in the men's Greco-Roman bantamweight at the 1960 Summer Olympics.

References

External links
 

1935 births
1974 deaths
Finnish male sport wrestlers
Olympic wrestlers of Finland
Wrestlers at the 1960 Summer Olympics
People from Kotka
Sportspeople from Kymenlaakso
20th-century Finnish people